The 2022 Grambling State Tigers football team will represent Grambling State University as a member of the Southwestern Athletic Conference (SWAC) during the 2022 NCAA Division I FCS football season. They will be led by head coach Hue Jackson, who will be coaching his first season with the program. The Tigers will play their home games at Eddie Robinson Stadium in Grambling, Louisiana.

Schedule
Grambling State finalized their 2022 schedule on January 26, 2022.

References

Grambling State Tigers
Grambling State Tigers football seasons
Grambling State Tigers